Hui'an railway station is a railway station located in Hui'an County, Quanzhou, Fujian Province, China, on the Fuzhou–Xiamen railway operated by the China Railway Nanchang Group, China Railway Corporation.

In early design documents the station have been referred to as "Hui'an West railway station".

References 

Railway stations in Fujian
Buildings and structures in Quanzhou